The Ovide River is a tributary of rivière à l'Ours, flowing successively in the unorganized territory of Lac-Ashuapmushuan, in the municipalities of Sainte-Hedwidge and Saint-Prime, in the Le Domaine-du-Roy Regional County Municipality, in the administrative region of Saguenay–Lac-Saint-Jean, in the province of Quebec, in Canada.

The Ovide river valley is served by forest roads.

Forestry is the main economic activity in this valley, as well as recreational tourism activities in the Zec de la Lièvre area.

The surface of the Ovide River is usually frozen from the beginning of December to the end of March, except the rapids areas; however, safe traffic on the ice is generally from mid-December to mid-March.

Geography 
The Ovide river draws its source from a wild lake unidentified, surrounded by marshes, in the Zec de la Lièvre in the unorganized territory of Lac-Ashuapmushuan. The mouth of this small lake is located at:
  south of downtown Saint-Félicien;
  south-west of downtown Saint-Prime;
  south-west of the mouth of the Ashuapmushuan River;
  south-west of the mouth of the Ovide river.

  south-west, curving south, to the outlet (coming from the west) of a small lake surrounded by marshes;
  to the east first in the marsh area, then forming a loop to the south, and enters Saint-Prime where it collects a stream (coming from the south ), then enters Sainte-Hedwidge, to a bend in the river.
  to the north by returning to Saint-Prime, by bending to the northeast by collecting a stream (coming from the southeast), until the outlet of the Ditche stream (coming from the west);
  first towards the north, then towards the northwest by forming a small loop towards the south, until its mouth.

The Ovide River flows into a bend on the southeast bank of the rivière à l'Ours, just downstream from a series of rapids. This confluence is located at:

  northeast of downtown Saint-Félicien;
  south-west of downtown Saint-Prime;
  south-west of the mouth of the Ashuapmushuan River;
  southwest of downtown Alma.

Toponymy 
The term "Ovide" turns out to be a first name.

The toponym "Ovide River" was formalized on May 11, 1976, at the Place Names Bank of the Commission de toponymie du Québec.

Notes and references

Appendices

Related articles 
 Le Domaine-du-Roy Regional County Municipality
 Lac-Ashuapmushuan, an unorganized territory
 Sainte-Hedwidge, a municipality
 Saint-Prime, a municipality
 Rivière à l'Ours
 Ashuapmushuan River
 Lac Saint-Jean, a body of water
 Saguenay River, a stream

External links 

Rivers of Saguenay–Lac-Saint-Jean
Le Domaine-du-Roy Regional County Municipality